Na Yeon Choi (born 28 October 1987) is a South Korean professional golfer playing on the U.S.-based LPGA Tour. In July 2012, she won the U.S. Women's Open for her first major championship.

Amateur career
At age 17 in 2004, Choi won the ADT CAPS Invitational on the LPGA of Korea Tour (KLPGA), beating future Hall-of-Famer Se Ri Pak by four strokes. Choi turned professional shortly thereafter, in November 2004. She won once each year on the KLPGA Tour in 2004 through 2007.

Professional career
In 2007, Choi played in the Hana Bank-KOLON Championship, an event co-sponsored by the LPGA and KLPGA Tours, and finished eighth. She attended LPGA Qualifying Tournament in the fall of 2007, but finished two shots shy of earning a fully exempt Tour card for the 2008 season. Her non-exempt card meant she was not automatically eligible for every event, yet her high conditional status and consistent good play put her in nearly every tournament. She won over $1 million and finished 11th on the 2008 money list with nine top-10 finishes in 27 events played. She finished second in the LPGA Rookie of the Year race, just behind winner Yani Tseng.

In 2009, Choi won twice on the LPGA Tour. In October she won the 20-player Samsung World Championship. Two weeks later she won the Hana Bank-KOLON Championship, an event co-sanctioned with the KLPGA. Her third LPGA Tour win came in July 2010 at the Jamie Farr Owens Corning Classic at which she beat three other players on the second hole of a sudden-death playoff. In 2010, Choi was both the LPGA Tour money leader and the leading scorer (Vare Trophy).

Professional wins (15)

LPGA Tour wins (9)

LPGA Tour playoff record (1–3)

LPGA of Korea Tour wins (8)

Major championships

Wins (1)

Results timeline
Results not in chronological order before 2019.

^ The Evian Championship was added as a major in 2013

CUT = missed the half-way cut
DQ = disqualified
NT = no tournament
T = tied

Summary

 Most consecutive cuts made – 9 (twice)
 Longest streak of top-10s – 3 (2009 LPGA – 2009 British Open)

LPGA Tour career summary

 official through 2022 season

Team appearances
Professional
 Lexus Cup (representing Asia team): 2008
 International Crown (representing South Korea): 2014

References

External links

Profile on Seoul Sisters site

South Korean female golfers
LPGA Tour golfers
LPGA of Korea Tour golfers
Winners of LPGA major golf championships
Konkuk University alumni
Golfers from Seoul
Golfers from Orlando, Florida
1987 births
Living people